The 1969 Hofstra Flying Dutchmen football team was an American football team that represented Hofstra University during the 1969 NCAA College Division football season. Hofstra lost every game and finished last in the Middle Atlantic Conference, University Division.

In their 20th year under head coach Howard "Howdy" Myers Jr., the Flying Dutchmen compiled an 0–10 record, and were outscored 283 to 175. Tom Dempsey, John Dobson, Joe Hunter and Tom Mulrooney were the team captains. This was Hofstra's first-ever winless season.

The Flying Dutchmen played their home games at Hofstra Stadium on the university's Hempstead campus on Long Island, New York.

Schedule

References

Hofstra
Hofstra Pride football seasons
College football winless seasons
Hofstra Flying Dutchmen football